Fellows of the Royal Society elected in 1969.

Fellows 

Horace Basil Barlow
Sir Robert Lewis Fullarton Boyd
John Hugh Chesters
Sir Alan Hugh Cook
George William Cooke
Peter Victor Danckwerts
Paul Fatt
John Robert Stanley Fincham
Harold Montague Finniston
William Sefton Fyfe
William Reginald Stephen Garton
Philip George Houthem Gell
Quentin Howieson Gibson
John Anthony Hardinge Giffard, 3rd Earl of Halsbury
Eugen Glueckauf
Benjamin Arthur Hems
George Adrian Horridge
Robin Ralph Jamison
Sir Aaron Klug
Leslie William Mapson
Sir Alexander Walter Merrison
Sir Charles William Oatley
Sir Thomas Angus Lyall Paton
 Sir William Stanley Peart
 Sir Herbert Charles Pereira
Sir Lionel Alexander Bethune Pilkington
Charles Terence Clegg Wall
Sir Alan Walsh
Philip Frank Wareing
Winifred May Watkins
Karel Frantisek Wiesner
James Hardy Wilkinson

Foreign members

Viktor Amazaspovich Ambartsumian
Inge Lehmann
Alfred Sherwood Romer
Kenneth Vivian Thimann

Statute 12 Fellow 

Harold Wilson

References

1969
1969 in science
1969 in the United Kingdom